The 1999 IBF World Championships (World Badminton Championships) were held in Copenhagen, Denmark, between 10 May and 23 May 1999. Following the results of the men's singles.

Seeds

Main stage

Section 1

Section 2

Section 3

Section 4

Final stage

External links 
 http://www.tournamentsoftware.com/sport/events.aspx?id=0C8BEFBC-C502-47FB-8C0B-A57F034F3452
 http://www.worldbadminton.com/results/19990518_WorldChampionships/results.htm

1999 IBF World Championships